HC Drita is a handball club based in Gjilan, Kosovo. HC Drita competes in the Kosovar Handball Superliga and the Kosovo Handball Cup, and it is one of the most famous handball clubs in Kosovo.

History 
HC Drita is founded in 1958. Drita was the champion of the season 1997/98. But this championship was interrupted due to the Kosovo war.

Titles 

Superliga:
Winners (1): 1998

Yugoslav Regional Championship:
Winners (5): 1967, 1973, 1974, 1984, 1986

References  

Kosovar handball clubs
Drita sports clubs